Kiota is a small town and rural commune in Niger in the Boboye Department, Dosso Region.
It is the seat of the most important Tijaniyyah community (a Sufi order) in Niger.
The weekly market is on Fridays.

References

Communes of Niger